Zornitsa Nedyalkova Popgancheva (born 22 June 1972), known professionally as Zornitsa Sofia, is a Bulgarian artist and filmmaker. She is best known for directing Mila from Mars (2004), which was Bulgaria's Academy Award for Best Foreign Language Film submission to the 77th Academy Awards. Her 2017 film Voevoda was screened at the Moscow International Film Festival.

Biography
Sofia was born on 22 June 1972 in Sofia, Bulgaria. She graduated from the National Academy of Fine Arts in 1996.
In 1997, she specialized in fine arts at the School of Visual Arts in New York, and in advertising and graphic design at the American University in Washington, D.C.

Sofia spent four years working as an art director for several international advertising agencies including Euro RSCG London. She took part in over 50 visual arts festivals and exhibitions around the world with her video art, installations and paintings before deciding to turn to filmmaking. In 2002, she specialized in film and television directing at the National Academy for Theatre and Film Arts under the supervision of Professor Ludmil Staikov.

Filmography
 Mila from Mars (2004)
 Forecast (2008)
 Voevoda (2017)
 Mother (2022)

Notes

References

External links
 

1972 births
Living people
People from Sofia
Film people from Sofia
Bulgarian filmmakers
Bulgarian film directors
Bulgarian screenwriters
School of Visual Arts alumni
American University alumni
National Academy for Theatre and Film Arts alumni